Hokkaido Sapporo Higashi High School (北海道札幌東高等学校, Hokkaidō Sapporo Higashi Kōtō Gakkō) is a high school in Sapporo, Hokkaido, Japan, founded in 1907. Hokkaido Sapporo Higashi High School is one of high schools administrated by Hokkaido.

The school is operated by the Hokkaido Prefectural Board of Education.

Notable alumni
Naomi Aduma (東 直己) Novelist; representative works: The Detective Is in the Bar Series 『探偵はBARにいる』, 『探偵はBARにいる2 ススキノ大交差点』. "The Detective Is in the Bar" movie series are based on novels written by Naomi Aduma.
Kazuko Fujita (藤田 和子) Manga Artist; representative works: Momoka Typhoon 『桃花タイフーン!!』 This Japanese manga "Momoka Typhoon" is base of a foreign drama Momo Love.
Hideo Murota (室田 日出男) Actor ; representative works: Battles Without Honor and Humanity: Police Tactics 『仁義なき戦い　頂上作戦』, Karate for Life 『空手バカ一代』 etc.

External links
Official Website of Hokkaido Sapporo Higashi High School

High schools in Hokkaido
Educational institutions established in 1907
1907 establishments in Japan